The Sydney Thunder (WBBL) are an Australian women's Twenty20 cricket team based in Sydney Olympic Park, New South Wales. They are one of two teams from Sydney to compete in the Women's Big Bash League, the other being the Sydney Sixers. The Thunder have claimed two WBBL titles, winning the league's inaugural championship and the 2020–21 title.

History

Formation
One of eight founding WBBL teams, the Sydney Thunder are aligned with the men's team of the same name. At the official WBBL launch on 10 July 2015, Rene Farrell was unveiled as the team's first-ever player signing. Joanne Broadbent was appointed as inaugural coach, while Alex Blackwell became the inaugural captain.

The Thunder played their first game on 6 December against the Sydney Sixers at Howell Oval in Penrith, winning by nine wickets with 40 balls remaining.

Rivalries

Brisbane Heat
The Thunder have combined with the Brisbane Heat to produce several "thrillers", including:

 12 January 2019, Cazaly's Stadium: Responding to the Thunder's first innings total of 7/171, Heat opener Beth Mooney recorded her maiden WBBL century but was then dismissed in the 17th over. With the Heat still requiring 19 runs off the last twelve balls, Harmanpreet Kaur—having already claimed two wickets, including the stumping of Mooney, for just ten runs—came on to bowl her third over. The Heat, primarily through Delissa Kimmince, scored 13 runs off the over to swing the momentum once more. Laura Harris then hit the winning runs against the bowling of Nicola Carey with three wickets in hand and three balls remaining, making it Brisbane's highest successful run chase. The result helped to set up a semi-final encounter between the two teams on the following weekend.
 19 January 2019, Drummoyne Oval: In the WBBL|04 semi-finals, the lower-ranked Heat posted a first innings total of 7/140. After struggling through the middle overs of the run chase, a late charge by the Thunder brought them back into the contest to leave a required five runs off the final delivery for victory. The last ball, sent down by spinner Jess Jonassen, was struck flat and cleanly to deep square leg by batter Nicola Carey. Jonassen immediately signalled disappointment as the ball set sail for beyond the boundary rope, therefore scoring six runs and clinching the match for the Thunder. However, Heat fielder Haidee Birkett made enough ground in time to take a "miracle" catch just inside the field of play to knock the Thunder out of the tournament. The match, in conjunction with the other semi-final played later in the day, was hailed as a showcase of "the irrefutable rise of women's cricket" and "sport with drama, skill and unpredictability – a potent recipe for success".
20 October 2019, North Sydney Oval: Thunder batters Alex Blackwell and Phoebe Litchfield set a new WBBL record for highest fourth-wicket partnership in their pursuit of the Heat's 9/150. The unbeaten 97-run stand, which got the Thunder over the line with seven balls to spare, was noted for the 20-year age gap between the two batting partners. At 16 years and 185 days, Litchfield also set a new WBBL record as the youngest player to score a half-century.

Perth Scorchers
The Thunder and the Perth Scorchers have met in two semi-finals:
 21 January 2016, Adelaide Oval: Defending a total of 6/118, the Thunder restricted the Scorchers to 9/110 and claimed victory by eight runs.
 1 February 2018, Perth Stadium: In the first innings, the Scorchers posted a total of 2/148. The Thunder were reeling by the 11th over of the run chase, having lost five wickets for just 46 runs. Fran Wilson piled on 46 runs from 28 balls late in the match but Perth, led by Emma King's 3/17, easily defended the target to win by 27 runs.

Due to a scheduling quirk, the two teams did not meet in the Thunder's home state of New South Wales until the 2020–21 Women's Big Bash League season (when the season was played entirely in Sydney due to uncertainty surrounding state border closures during the COVID-19 pandemic). From 2017 to 2018, five of their regular season encounters were played at Lilac Hill Park and characterised by close finishes, including:
 7 January 2018: The Scorchers were well poised to chase down their target of 146 until a catch on the boundary by Thunder fielder Lisa Griffith dismissed Nicole Bolton for 71 in the 18th over. On the last ball of the match, Scorchers batter Mathilda Carmichael was run out by a metre while attempting a game-tying run, therefore securing victory for the Thunder by the narrowest of margins.
 29 December 2018: The Thunder were catapulted to a score of 5/179 by a late 49-run partnership between Harmanpreet Kaur and Stafanie Taylor (which included 21 runs off the 18th over against the bowling of Taneale Peschel, who had taken 1/12 in her first three overs). Eight overs into the second innings, captain Meg Lanning had scored 71 of the Scorchers' 83 runs. Although Lanning was run out for 76 in the tenth over, Elyse Villani went on to score 66 not out, guiding the Scorchers to a six-wicket victory with one ball remaining. In doing so, the Scorchers set a new WBBL record for highest successful run chase.

Sydney Sixers
At the WBBL|02 season launch, Thunder captain Alex Blackwell said the Sydney Sixers "desperately want to beat us and we desperately want to beat them. It's set up to be a really good rivalry." In a joint media conference ahead of WBBL|05, Sixers captain Ellyse Perry said she considers the Thunder "our biggest rivals" while the Thunder's Rachel Priest claimed "it was a really intense rivalry right when I started with the team". Noteworthy matches include:

 24 January 2016, Melbourne Cricket Ground: Having lost their first six games of the season, the Sixers stormed into the WBBL|01 final by winning nine consecutive matches. Their streak would come to an end in a low-scoring championship decider plagued by "probably the worst fielding seen all tournament" from both teams. Ultimately the Thunder scraped home by three wickets with three balls remaining to claim the inaugural Women's Big Bash title. Erin Osborne earned Player of the Final honours for her bowling figures of 3/21 off four overs.
 14 January 2017, Sydney Cricket Ground: Defending a first innings total of 138, Sixers off-spinner Lauren Smith conceded seven runs in the last over to tie the game. With scores still level after the subsequent super over, the Thunder were awarded the win on the boundary count back rule. Despite the intense rivalry between the two teams, the match was noted for a sporting gesture by Thunder captain Alex Blackwell who, suspecting she interfered with the batter, withdrew an appeal that would have led to the dismissal of the Sixers' Sara McGlashan.
 15 November 2019, Drummoyne Oval: The Sixers cruised to a comfortable 40-run victory, having also defeated the Thunder by 49 runs in the season opener—Perry top-scoring with 81 on both occasions. This marked the first time either team would sweep their fellow Sydneysiders in the regular season.

Captaincy records

There have been three captains in the Thunder's history, including matches featuring an acting captain.

Source:

Season summaries

Home grounds

Players

Current squad

Australian representatives
 The following is a list of cricketers who have played for the Thunder after making their debut in the national women's team (the period they spent as both a Thunder squad member and an Australian-capped player is in brackets):

Overseas marquees

Associate rookies

Statistics and awards

Team stats
Champions: 2 – WBBL01, WBBL06
Runners-up: 0
Minor premiers: 1 – WBBL01
 Win–loss record:

 Highest score in an innings: 6/200 (20 overs) vs Melbourne Renegades, 9 December 2017
 Highest successful chase: 4/156 (17.2 overs) vs Hobart Hurricanes, 21 December 2018
 Lowest successful defence: 9/104 (20 overs) vs Melbourne Stars, 17 January 2016
 Largest victory:
 Batting first: 58 runs vs Adelaide Strikers, 31 October 2020
 Batting second: 50 balls remaining vs Melbourne Renegades, 27 December 2016
 Longest winning streak: 5 matches
 Longest losing streak: 6 matches

Source:

Individual stats
 Most runs: Rachael Haynes – 2,142
 Highest score in an innings: Smriti Mandhana – 114* (64) vs Melbourne Renegades, 17 November 2021
 Highest partnership: Smriti Mandhana and Tahlia Wilson – 125* vs Melbourne Renegades, 17 November 2021
 Most wickets: Samantha Bates – 95
 Best bowling figures in an innings: Lauren Smith – 5/17 (4 overs) vs Perth Scorchers, 22 October 2022

 Most catches (fielder): Phoebe Litchfield – 28
 Most dismissals (wicket-keeper): Rachel Priest – 33 (12 catches, 21 stumpings)

Source:

Individual awards
 Player of the Match:
 Stafanie Taylor – 8
 Alex Blackwell – 7
 Samantha Bates, Rene Farrell, Rachael Haynes – 4 each
 Shabnim Ismail,  Sammy-Jo Johnson, Heather Knight, Naomi Stalenberg – 3 each
 Nicola Carey, Harmanpreet Kaur, Rachel Priest – 2 each
 Lauren Cheatle, Hannah Darlington, Lisa Griffith, Phoebe Litchfield, Smriti Mandhana, Erin Osborne, Deepti Sharma, Lauren Smith, Belinda Vakarewa, Issy Wong – 1 each

 WBBL Team of the Tournament:
 Hannah Darlington (2) – WBBL06, WBBL07
Rene Farrell (2) – WBBL01, WBBL03
 Alex Blackwell – WBBL|01
 Stafanie Taylor – WBBL04
 Samantha Bates – WBBL|06
 Heather Knight – WBBL|06
 WBBL Young Gun Award:
 Lauren Cheatle – WBBL01
 Hannah Darlington – WBBL05
 Phoebe Litchfield – WBBL07

Sponsors

See also

Cricket in New South Wales
Cricket NSW
New South Wales Breakers
Sydney Sixers (WBBL)

References

Notes

External links
 

 
Women's Big Bash League teams
Cricket in New South Wales
Sports teams in Sydney
Cricket clubs established in 2015
2015 establishments in Australia